Alexandros Tombazis (born 10 April 1939) is a Greek architect. With more than 800 projects - about 300 of them built - and at least 110 prizes gained in competitions he is one of Greece's most prominent architects.

He is the father of Nikolas Tombazis, the Formula 1 designer.

Photo gallery - works

References 

http://www.tombazis.com/

External links
 http://www.pbase.com/image/87433820
 https://archive.today/20130217152531/http://www.athensnews.gr/portal/23/23685
 http://www.greekarchitects.gr/en/piraeus-tower/alexandros-tombazispiraeus-tower-2010-id3750
 https://web.archive.org/web/20120717035356/http://www.greekarchitects.gr/gr/%CE%B1%CF%86%CE%B9%CE%B5%CF%81%CF%8E%CE%BC%CE%B1%CF%84%CE%B1/%CE%BF-%CE%B1%CF%81%CF%87%CE%B9%CF%84%CE%AD%CE%BA%CF%84%CE%BF%CE%BD%CE%B1%CF%82-%CE%B1%CE%BB%CE%AD%CE%BE%CE%B1%CE%BD%CE%B4%CF%81%CE%BF%CF%82-%CF%84%CE%BF%CE%BC%CF%80%CE%AC%CE%B6%CE%B7%CF%82-id1406

Greek architects
1939 births
National Technical University of Athens
Living people
People from New Delhi